Ștefan Kaban (born 30 August 1945) is a Romanian former sports shooter. He competed at the 1968 Summer Olympics and the 1976 Summer Olympics.

References

1945 births
Living people
Romanian male sport shooters
Olympic shooters of Romania
Shooters at the 1968 Summer Olympics
Shooters at the 1976 Summer Olympics
People from Holzminden